Milton Rokeach (born in Hrubieszów as Mendel Rokicz, December 27, 1918 – October 25, 1988) was a Polish-American social psychologist. He taught at Michigan State University, the University of Western Ontario, Washington State University, and the University of Southern California. A Review of General Psychology survey, published in 2002, ranked Rokeach as the 85th most cited psychologist of the 20th century.

Early life
Born to Jewish parents in Hrubieszów, Poland, Rokeach emigrated to the United States with his parents at age seven. After graduating from Brooklyn College, he received his Ph.D degree from the University of California, Berkeley, in 1947.

Contributions to psychology

Rokeach conducted a well-known experiment in which he observed the interaction of three mentally ill patients at the Ypsilanti State Hospital, each of whom believed he was Jesus Christ, from 1959 to 1961. The book he wrote about the experiment, The Three Christs of Ypsilanti, was subsequently adapted into a screenplay, a stage play, two operas  and a movie.

Rokeach also conducted a mid-20th–century study in the American South in which he tried to determine the basis for racial prejudice. He found racial prejudice to be inversely related to socio-economic status and thus concluded that such bias is used in an attempt to elevate one's own status.

His book The Nature of Human Values (1973) and the Rokeach Value Survey (see values scales), which the book served as the test manual for, occupied the final years of his career. In it, he posited that a relatively few "terminal human values" are the internal reference points that all people use to formulate attitudes and opinions, and that by measuring the "relative ranking" of these values one could predict a wide variety of behavior, including political affiliation and religious belief. This theory led to a series of experiments in which changes in values led to measurable changes in opinion for an entire small city in the state of Washington.

Awards
In 1984, Rokeach received the Kurt Lewin Memorial Award of the American Psychological Association. In 1988, he received the Harold Lasswell Award of the International Society of Political Psychology.

Bibliography
The Open and Closed Mind (1960)
The Three Christs of Ypsilanti Google Books Link (1964)
Beliefs, Attitudes, and Values: A Theory of Organization and Change (1968)
The Nature of Human Values (1973)
Understanding Human Values: Individual and Societal (1979)
The Great American Values Test: Influencing Behavior and Belief Through Television (Ball-Rokeach, S., Rokeach, M., and Grube, J.W.; 1984)

References

20th-century American psychologists
1918 births
1988 deaths
Michigan State University faculty
Washington State University faculty
University of California, Berkeley alumni
Social psychologists
Polish emigrants to the United States
American people of Polish-Jewish descent
Brooklyn College alumni